was the pen name of Japanese novelist and writer . Her works of fiction have been described as focusing on topics such as complex interpersonal relationships and the anxieties of the youth.

Sagisawa published her debut novel  in 1987, for which she became the youngest person to win the Bungakukai Prize for New Authors.

Early life and career 
Megumu Sagisawa was born in Tokyo, Japan on 20 June 1968, as the youngest of four sisters. Her parents divorced when she was fifteen years old.

Sagisawa published her debut novel  in 1987, while she was in university, although she wrote it in high school. The novel received favourable attention due to its subtle portrayal of the struggles of adolescent life. She then began studying Russian at the Sophia University Department of Foreign Studies in the same year, but left the university before graduating.

In 1989, she published the novel , which became a candidate for the Akutagawa Prize, but did not win. Since then, she was selected as a candidate for the prize four more times. She was awarded the 1992 Izumi Kyōka Prize for Literature for her novel . While writing the novel, she learned that her grandmother was originally from Korea. She began studying Korean language abroad at Yonsei University in 1993. In 2002, she published an autobiographical novel titled .

Sagisawa was also a noted essayist and translator of children's picture books. Her book  was first published in late March 2004, and was set to be staged under her own production in June.

Sagisawa died on 11 April 2004 at her residence in Meguro, Tokyo, Japan. The cause of her death was initially reported as heart failure, but was later found by the Tokyo Metropolitan Police Department to have been a suicide. Following her death, Korean newspapers The Chosun Ilbo, The Hankyoreh, and The Dong-a Ilbo described her as one of Japan's leading female Korean writers.

Selected works 
Sagisawa's works of fiction have been described as focusing on topics such as complex interpersonal relationships and the "anxieties of young people." She released more than twenty novels and short story collections through her career, which have been translated into Italian, Korean, and English. Her works include:
 , 1987
 , Bungeishunjū, 1989
 , Kawade Shobo Shinsha, 1990
 , Bungeishunjū, 1992
 English translation: Grillo, Tyran. The Running Boy and Other Stories, Cornell University Press, 2020
 , Kawade Shobo Shinsha, 1993
 , 1994
 , Kadokawa Shoten, 2002
 , Sakuhinsha, 2004 (with Hidetake Kobayashi)
 , Shinchosha, 2006

Personal life 
Sagisawa married director Gō Rijū in 1990. They divorced a year later.

Sagisawa was of Korean descent. Her grandmother, born in Taechon, Korea, was a first-generation Korean immigrant to Japan who lived in Tokyo and married a Japanese man.

References

External links 
  (in Japanese)
 

1968 births
2004 suicides
People from Ōta, Tokyo
Writers from Tokyo
20th-century Japanese women writers
20th-century Japanese novelists
21st-century Japanese novelists
21st-century Japanese women writers
Japanese women novelists
Japanese people of Korean descent
Japanese translators
Japanese women essayists
Japanese essayists
Women dramatists and playwrights
20th-century Japanese dramatists and playwrights
21st-century Japanese dramatists and playwrights
20th-century translators
Suicides in Japan